, UNESCO members include 193 member states and 11 associate members. Some members have additional National Organizing Committees (NOCs) for some of their dependent territories. The associate members are non-independent states.

Three UNESCO member states are not UN member states: Cook Islands, Niue, and Palestine (Palestine is a non-member observer State of the United Nations General Assembly since 29 November 2012), while three UN member states (Israel, Liechtenstein, United States) are not UNESCO members.  The United States and Israel were members, but left on 31 December 2018 asserting that the organization had an anti-Israel bias.

Kosovo was approved for membership by UNESCO's executive board in 2015, but the proposal did not receive the required 2/3 of votes in favour at the general conference.

Member States
The 193 UNESCO member states, as of January 2019, with the date on which they became members, are:

  (4 May 1948)
  (16 October 1958)
  (15 October 1962)
  (20 October 1993)
  (11 March 1977)
  (15 July 1982)
  (15 September 1948)
  (9 June 1992)
  (4 November 1946)
  (13 August 1948)
  (3 June 1992)
  (23 April 1981)
  (18 January 1972)
  (27 October 1972)
  (24 October 1968)
  (12 May 1954)
  (29 November 1946)
  (10 May 1982)
  (18 October 1960)
  (13 April 1982)
  (13 November 1946)
  (2 June 1993)
  (16 January 1980)
  (4 November 1946)
  (17 March 2005)
  (17 May 1956)
  (14 November 1960)
  (16 November 1962)
  (3 July 1951)
  (11 November 1960)
  (4 November 1946)
  (15 February 1978)
  (11 November 1960)
  (19 December 1960)
  (7 July 1953)
  (4 November 1946)
 including separate NOC for 
  (31 October 1947)
  (22 March 1977)
  (24 October 1960)
  (25 October 1989)
  (19 May 1950)
  (27 October 1960)
  (1 June 1992)
  (29 August 1947)
  (6 February 1961)
  (22 February 1993)
  (25 November 1960)
  (4 November 1946)
 including the territory of 
  (31 August 1989)
  (9 January 1979)
  (4 November 1946)
  (22 January 1947)
  (4 November 1946)
  (28 April 1948)
  (29 November 1979)
  (2 September 1993)
  (14 October 1991)
  (25 January 1978)
  (1 July 1955)
  (14 July 1983)
  (10 October 1956)
  (4 November 1946)
  (16 November 1960)
  (1 August 1973)
  (7 October 1992)
  (11 July 1951)
  (11 April 1958)
  (4 November 1946)
  (17 February 1975)
  (2 January 1950)
  (2 February 1960)
  (1 November 1974)
  (21 March 1967)
  (18 November 1946)
  (16 December 1947)
  (14 September 1948)
  (8 June 1964)
  (4 November 1946)
  (27 May 1950)
  (6 September 1948)
  (21 October 1948)
  (3 October 1961)
  (27 January 1948)
  (7 November 1962)
  (2 July 1951)
  (14 June 1950)
  (22 May 1992)
  (7 April 1964)
  (24 October 1989)
  (18 October 1974)
  (14 June 1950)
  (18 November 1960)
  (2 June 1992)
  (9 July 1951)
  (14 October 1991)
  (4 November 1946)
  (29 September 1967)
  (6 March 1947)
  (27 June 1953)
  (7 October 1991)
  (27 October 1947)
  (10 November 1960)
  (27 October 1964)
  (16 June 1958)
  (18 July 1980)
  (7 November 1960)
  (10 February 1965)
  (30 June 1995)
  (10 January 1962)
  (25 October 1968)
  (4 November 1946)
  (19 October 1999)
  (27 May 1992)
  (6 July 1949)
  (1 November 1962)
  (1 March 2007)
  (7 November 1956)
  (11 October 1976)
  (27 June 1949)
  (2 November 1978)
  (17 October 1996)
  (1 May 1953)
  (1 January 1947)
  (4 November 1946)
  (22 February 1952)
  (10 November 1960)
  (14 November 1960)
  (26 October 1993)
  (28 June 1993)
  (4 November 1946)
  (10 February 1972)
  (14 September 1949)
  (20 September 1999)
  (23 November 2011)
  (10 January 1950)
  (4 October 1976)
  (20 June 1955)
  (21 November 1946)
  (21 November 1946)
  (6 November 1946)
  (11 September 1974)
  (27 January 1972)
  (27 July 1956)
  (21 April 1954) 
  (7 November 1962)
  (26 October 1983)
  (6 March 1980)
  (14 January 1983)
  (3 April 1981)
  (12 November 1974)
  (22 January 1980)
  (4 November 1946)
  (10 November 1960)
  (20 December 2000)
  (18 October 1976)
  (28 March 1962)
  (8 October 2007)
  (9 February 1993)
  (27 May 1992)
  (7 September 1993)
  (15 November 1960)
  (12 December 1994)
  (27 October 2011)
  (30 January 1953)
  (14 November 1949)
  (26 November 1956)
  (16 July 1976)
  (23 January 1950)
  (28 January 1949)
 including separate NOC for 
  (16 November 1946)
  (6 April 1993)
  (6 March 1962)
  (1 January 1949)
  (5 June 2003)
  (17 November 1960)
  (29 September 1980)
  (2 November 1962)
  (8 November 1956)
  (4 November 1946)
  (17 August 1993)
  (21 October 1991)
  (9 November 1962)
  (12 May 1954)
  (20 April 1972)
  (1 July 1997)
 including separate NOC for 
  (8 November 1947)
  (26 October 1993)
  (10 February 1994)
  (25 November 1946)
  (6 July 1951)
  (2 April 1962)
  (9 November 1964)
  (22 September 1980)

Currently  is not a member of UNESCO, but they have an NOC under Switzerland's membership.

Former members
  (16 September 1949–31 December 2018)
  (4 November 1946–31 December 1984; 1 October 2003–31 December 2018)

Both Israel and the United States withdrew claiming that the organization had an anti-Israel bias.

Associate members
The 12 associate members of UNESCO and the date on which they became associate members:
  (9 November 2021)
  (5 November 2013)
  (20 October 1987)
  (24 November 1983)
  (30 October 1999)
  (25 October 2011)
  (12 October 2009)
  (25 October 1995)
  (3 November 2015)
  (30 October 2017)
  (25 October 2011)
  (15 October 2001)

Observers
There are 2 Permanent Observers and 10 intergovernmental organizations with Permanent Observer Missions to UNESCO.
Non-member States
 
Entities
 
Intergovernmental organizations
 African Union
 Arab League Educational, Cultural and Scientific Organization
 Council of Europe
 European Union
 Inter-American Development Bank
 Islamic Educational, Scientific and Cultural Organization
 Latin American Faculty of Social Sciences
 Latin Union
 League of Arab States
 Organization of Ibero-American States for Education, Science and Culture

In addition, there is a liaison office of the United Nations University at UNESCO.

See also

Member states of the United Nations

Notes

References 

UNESCO
UNESCO